An oak is a tree or shrub in the genus Quercus in the plant family Fagaceae. When all capitalized, OAK most frequently refers to Oakland International Airport in Oakland, California.

Oak or OAK may also refer to:

Plants
Allocasuarina, she-oak
Allocasuarina decaisneana, desert oak
Casuarina, she-oak
Casuarina glauca, swamp oak
Lagunaria, white oak
Grevillea robusta, silky oak
Silky oak (disambiguation)
Toxicodendron, poison oak
Grey oak
Various tanbark oak or stone oak species in genera:
Lithocarpus
Notholithocarpus

People
P. N. Oak (1917–2007), controversial Indian historian
Oak Felder, songwriter and record producer
Arnold Schwarzenegger, whose long term nickname in the world of bodybuilding is 'The Oak'

Places
In the United States
Oak, Missouri
Oak, Nebraska
Oak, West Virginia
Oak Township, Stearns County, Minnesota

Elsewhere
Oakleigh railway station, in suburban Melbourne, Australia, MTM station code

Other uses
Donar's Oak, an oak tree believed to be sacred by Germanic pagans
Oak (band), English folk band
Oak (programming language), a programming language that evolved into Java
OAK Racing, endurance racing team
OAK (flavoured milk), an Australian brand of favoured milk
Oak Industries, a defunct American electronics company
Oak Technology, a defunct chipset maker
Mr. Oak, a fictional character from the Doctor Who story Fury from the Deep
Professor Oak, a fictional character of the anime, manga, and RPG series Pokémon
Oakland Athletics, a Major League Baseball team based in Oakland, California
Oak (wine), the use of oak in winemaking
United Aircraft Building Corporation (Russian: OAK), company formed by merger of several Russian aerospace firms
The Oak, 1992 Romanian film by Lucian Pintilie

See also
Quercus (disambiguation)
List of Quercus species
Oaks (disambiguation)
Oak Tree (disambiguation)
Oak Creek (disambiguation)